Lexias cyanipardus, the great archduke, is a species of butterfly belonging to the family Nymphalidae. It was first described by Arthur Gardiner Butler in 1869. It is found in the Indomalayan realm.

Subspecies
L. c. cyanipardus Assam to Yunnan
L. c. grandis  Yokochi, 1991   Thailand,  Yunnan

References

External links
Funet
Yutaka Inayoshi - Butterflies in Indo-China

cyanipardus